Baby I Don't Care is a budget compilation album by the British pop rock band Transvision Vamp comprising all their singles, selected album tracks and extended versions. It was released on CD in 2002 on the Spectrum Music label.

The artwork utilises a repeated picture of Wendy James in a pop-art style and the four-page booklet contains an essay by Daryl Easlea of Record Collector magazine.

Track listing
All tracks by Nick Christian Sayer except where noted

"I Want Your Love" – 3:29
"Baby I Don't Care" – 4:37
"Tell That Girl to Shut Up" (Holly Beth Vincent) – 3:06
"Revolution Baby" – 4:53
"Sister Moon" – 4:23
"(I Just Wanna) B with U" (Wendy James, Sayer) – 4:21
"The Only One" – 4:19
"Landslide of Love" – 3:48
"If Looks Could Kill" – 4:10
"Kiss Their Sons" – 4:16
"Every Little Thing" – 3:59
"Bad Valentine" – 3:45
"Velveteen" – 9:51
"Born to Be Sold" – 3:44
"Revolution Baby" (Electra-glide Mix) – 6:01
"Tell That Girl to Shut Up" (Knuckle Duster Mix) (Vincent) – 4:44
"Baby I Don't Care" (Abigail's Party Mix) – 5:45

Personnel 
 Wendy James – vocals
 Nick Christian Sayer – guitar
 Dave Parsons – bass
 Tex Axile – keyboards and drums
 Pol Burton – drums

Charts

Notes
Once again (I Just Wanna) B with U is incorrectly titled. This time as "(I Just Wanna) Be With You".
Daryl Easlea wrongly states that the title of Transvision Vamp's third album was "The Little Magnets Versus The Bubble Of Babble". It was simply Little Magnets Versus the Bubble of Babble.

References

Transvision Vamp albums
1998 compilation albums